The 71st edition of the Omloop Het Nieuwsblad was held on 27 February 2016. It was won by Belgian Greg Van Avermaet in a five-man sprint before Peter Sagan and Tiesj Benoot.

The race started and finished in Ghent, Belgium, covering 200.8 km. The Omloop marked the start of the cobbled classics season in Europe and was rated as a 1.HC event of the 2016 UCI Europe Tour.

Preview

Route
The Omloop Het Nieuwsblad started in Ghent, East Flanders, and addressed the Flemish Ardennes in the south of the province, featuring numerous short climbs, before returning to Ghent. This edition, organizers needed to find an alternative for the traditional start and finish location on Sint-Pietersplein. In 2016 organizers chose , the site adjacent to the Kuipke velodrome, as the start location. The finish was on Emile Claus thoroughfare, close to the starting place.

At 200 kilometres and with a dozen climbs in the hill zone, the course was challenging and arduous. Additionally, there were several flat stretches of cobbles. The race featured one new climb, Boembekeberg, as a replacement for the Molenberg, which was skipped because of road works.

There are thirteen categorized climbs:

Pre-race favourites
Britain's Ian Stannard, the winner of the previous two editions, was not present in this year's event. World champion Peter Sagan was among the key favourites, together with classics specialists Alexander Kristoff, Tom Boonen, Greg Van Avermaet and Philippe Gilbert. Former world time trial champion Tony Martin made a first appearance.














Teams
25 teams were invited: 12 UCI WorldTeams and 13 continental teams. In total, 199 riders were at the start.

Race report
Greg Van Avermaet, Luke Rowe and Tiesj Benoot broke clear on Taaienberg, immediately being joined by Peter Sagan on the descent. The four riders caught the remaining early escapees and dropped them all on the last cobbled sections, except for Gougeard. Powering on to Ghent, the elite group stayed clear until the finish and the race was decided in a five-man sprint. Van Avermaet led out the slightly uphill sprint from afar and sealed his first win of the season. Sagan was second, Benoot third. Jens Debusschere won the sprint for sixth place, nine seconds behind Van Avermaet.

Results

Notes

References

External links

 

Omloop Het Nieuwsblad
Omloop Het Nieuwsblad – Men's race
Omloop Het Nieuwsblad
Omloop Het Nieuwsblad